Christopher Phillips (born July 24, 1972, in Crossett, Arkansas) is a retired American athlete who specialized in the 110 metres hurdles.

At the 2003 World Championships, Phillips achieved a lifetime best of 13.26 seconds in the first round. He eventually reached the final, but was disqualified for modafinil doping. A month later, he finished fifth at the World Athletics Final.

Phillips competed collegiately for the track powerhouse University of Arkansas.

Anti-doping rule violation
In 2003 Philips received a public warning for an anti-doping rule violation after he'd tested positive for Modafinil.

References
 

1972 births
Living people
American male hurdlers
Doping cases in athletics
American sportspeople in doping cases
Arkansas Razorbacks men's track and field athletes
People from Crossett, Arkansas